Manayunk West, often just Manayunk, was a SEPTA Regional Rail station in Manayunk, Philadelphia. It was located on ex-Pennsylvania Railroad Schuylkill Branch and served by SEPTA's Ivy Ridge Line commuter trains. The station stood at the corner of Dupont and High, a short distance from the ex-Reading Company station at Manayunk. SEPTA suspended service beyond Cynwyd on May 27, 1986, because of poor track conditions and concerns about the Manayunk Bridge. The station has since been demolished.

References 

Former Pennsylvania Railroad stations
Former SEPTA Regional Rail stations
Railway stations closed in 1986